Cephalissa is a monotypic moth genus in the family Geometridae. Its only species, Cephalissa siria, the orange triangle moth, is endemic to New Zealand. This species has been classified as nationally vulnerable by the Department of Conservation. It has suffered a contraction of its range, no longer being seen in Dunedin or Invercargill. It is currently found in the Mt Watkin Scenic Reserve, in eastern Otago, in the Rongahere Gorge and in the Dansey Ecological District. C. siria is known to inhabit kahikatea forest amongst Carex species as well as short tussock grasslands and shrubland. The larval host plant is Fuchsia perscandens. Adult moths are on the wing in October and November.

Taxonomy 
This genus and species were first described by Edward Meyrick in 1883 using specimens collected by Frederick Hutton in Dunedin. In 1884 Meyrick described both the genus and the species in greater detail. In 1898 George Vernon Hudson described and illustrated the species under the name Hydriomena siria. Hudson also used the same synonym when he described and illustrated the species in his 1928 publication. John S. Dugdale also discussed the species in 1971 and placed this species in the genus Hydriomena was in doubt. In 1988 Dugdale confirmed this placement. The lectotype specimen, collected in Dunedin, is held at the Natural History Museum, London.

Description 

Meyrick described the species as follows:

Distribution 
This species is endemic to New Zealand. Along with the type locality of Dunedin, Hudson noted that the species was also present at the Waihopai Scenic Reserve near Invercargill. In 1939 Hudson mentioned that the species was present in the Waianiwa and Takitimo mountains in Southland. This species has suffered a contraction of its range. It is no longer seen in Dunedin nor Invercargill, but is still present in eastern Otago and in the Rongahere Gorge on the Clutha River. It has been located in the Dansey Ecological District which is regarded to be the northern limit of its range. The species has also been located at the Mt Watkin Scenic Reserve, north of Dunedin.

Habitat 
Hudson stated that the species was seen in kahikatea forest amongst Carex species. C. siria is also known to inhabit the short tussock grasslands and shrubland in the Dansey Ecological District.

Biology and life cycle 
The adult moths are on the wing in October and November.

Host species 

The host plant for the larvae of this species is Fuchsia perscandens.

Conservation status
This moth is classified under the New Zealand Threat Classification system as being nationally vulnerable. In 2017 the Department of Conservation included C. siria in a list of 150 species to be prioritised for conservation.

References

Larentiinae
Moths described in 1883
Moths of New Zealand
Endemic fauna of New Zealand
Endangered biota of New Zealand
Taxa named by Edward Meyrick
Monotypic moth genera
Endemic moths of New Zealand